The Gruye-Vogt Organization (originally Gruyé-Vogt-Opperman Inc., and throughout its history most often known as GVO) was a design consultancy founded in 1966 by industrial designers Dale W. Gruyé and Noland E. Vogt together with graphic designer George Opperman, in Palo Alto, California, the heart of Silicon Valley.

Gruye had been an industrial design engineer at Hewlett-Packard, and Vogt had worked at General Electric and then Ampex; they were joined by Opperman in founding a firm that combined graphic design, marketing, advertising, and industrial design services, an unusual combination at the time. GVO was one of the first firms to integrate design with research based on human factors and ethnographic methods for technology companies in Silicon Valley.

GVO conducted projects for clients including Syntex, Johnson Controls, GRiD Systems Corporation, Huggies, and Canon.

Opperman left GVO in 1971 to found his own firm, Opperman-Harrington Inc. (this prompted GVO to restyle itself as the Gruye-Vogt Organization, and to keep the same abbreviation), and would go on to design the iconic logo for Atari; Gruye left the firm in 1984 to found his own, Gruye Associates. GVO eventually went bankrupt in the midst of the dotcom crash, and closed in September 2001.

References 

Industrial design firms
Design companies of the United States
Companies based in San Francisco
Design companies established in 1966